Podbreže is a small village south of Štorje in the Municipality of Sežana in the Littoral region of Slovenia.

References

External links

Podbreže on Geopedia

Populated places in the Municipality of Sežana